Regret to Inform is a 1998 American documentary film directed by Barbara Sonneborn. It was nominated for an Academy Award for Best Documentary Feature,. After airing on PBS' POV, Regret to Inform won a Peabody Award in 2000.

The film was made over a span of ten years. The documentary features filmmaker Barbara Sonneborn as she goes to the Vietnamese countryside where her husband was killed. Her translator is a fellow war widow named Xuan Ngoc Nguyen and together, the two women try to understand their losses. The film includes interviews with Vietnamese and American widows.

References

External links

Regret to Inform at POV

1998 films
American documentary films
Black-and-white documentary films
Documentary films about the Vietnam War
Peabody Award-winning broadcasts
1998 documentary films
American black-and-white films
1990s English-language films
1990s American films